Legislative Assembly elections were held in Sikkim, in November 1994, to elect the 32 members of the fifth Legislative Assembly.

Results

Elected members

References

State Assembly elections in Sikkim
1990s in Sikkim
Sikkim